The Watercress Line is the marketing name of the Mid-Hants Railway, a heritage railway in Hampshire, England, running  from New Alresford to Alton where it connects to the National Rail network. The line gained its popular name in the days when it was used to transport locally grown watercress to markets in London. The railway currently operates regular scheduled services, along with dining trains, real ale trains and numerous special events throughout the year.

History

British Railways ownership 
In 1861, the Alton, Alresford and Winchester Railway Company was authorised to build a new railway to connect to the existing London & South Western Railway lines at Alton and Winchester. It was opened on 2 October 1865 as the Mid-Hants Railway. Trains were operated by the London & South Western Railway which eventually purchased the Mid-Hants Railway Company in 1884.

Stations were initially constructed at Itchen Abbas, Ropley and Alresford. The station at Medstead and Four Marks was added in 1868. Just outside this station, the line is at its highest point ( above sea level) having risen from Alresford ( above sea level) and descending to Alton ( above sea level). The section of line became known as "the Alps", due to the steep gradients that exist there.

The line provided an alternative route between London and Southampton and, besides transporting locally produced watercress, was particularly important for military traffic between the army town of Aldershot and the military embarkation port at Southampton.

With the development of motorised transport, the line declined during the inter-war and post-war periods of the 20th Century and was further compromised by the closures of the Basingstoke and Alton Light Railway in 1932 and the Meon Valley Railway in 1955. Electrification of the line from London to Alton in 1937 meant that the Watercress Line was no longer part of a through route; it became necessary to change at Alton. Electrification of the line from London to Southampton occurred in 1967, which further affected the economics of the Mid-Hants route.

The line became part of the Southern Railway in 1923 and then part of the Southern Region of British Railways in 1948. It survived the Beeching Axe in 1963, but was eventually closed by British Railways in February 1973. During final years of operation under British Rail, passenger train services were operated by Class 205 ("2H") two carriage diesel-electric multiple units.

In 1941, prototype Merchant Navy Class 21C1 Channel Packet travelled as far as Alresford after the naming ceremony at Southampton for a trial run with press and dignitaries.

Heritage railway 

The section of line from Alresford to Alton that can be seen today was purchased from British Rail in November 1975. Reconstruction of the line subsequently progressed in stages. The section between Alresford and Ropley re-opened on 30 April 1977. To provide engineering and maintenance facilities, the main locomotive shed and workshops were constructed at Ropley. The extension to Medstead & Four Marks opened on 28 May 1983 and the final section to Alton opened on 25 May 1985.

On 12 June 1982, a replica of Sans Pareil visited the Watercress Line, running successfully under its own power from Ropley to Alresford.

Some of the structures that can be seen on the line today were not part of the original railway infrastructure; they have been added to make the line serviceable again and to recreate the feel of a fully operational steam railway. The line is now maintained by a small base of paid staff (mostly in administrative duties) and a core of over 400 volunteers.

The railway is a registered charity.

Locomotives and rolling stock 

The Mid-Hants Railway plays host to a large collection of steam and diesel locomotives, passenger carriages and restored wagons, most of which are from the 1920s to 1960s period. Steam locomotives operated include Bulleid Pacifics of the Merchant Navy and West Country, SR Lord Nelson class, Schools Class, S15, BR Standard Class 4, 9F, LMS Ivatt Tank & Black 5. Operated alongside these are a number of diesel locomotives including Class 33s, a Class 47, a Class 50, a Class 03 shunter, Class 08 shunters, a Class 11 shunter, and a Class 205 "Hampshire" multiple unit.

Infrastructure

Stations of the Watercress Line 

The Watercress Line has four stations on the site of former British Rail stations. Each features a passing loop, allowing trains to pass one another, or locomotives to run round trains for a change of direction of travel. Alton station has three platforms, platforms 1 and 2 being operated by the national rail network, and platform 3 by the Watercress Line. The other three stations each have two platforms with connecting footbridges.

 – at the north-east end of the line. Alton has one passenger platform (two others are assigned to South Western Railway), with a cross-platform connection to the town and onward services to London Waterloo. Alton has two passing loops, one within station limits, and another just outside, allowing trains to pass outside the station, thus reducing the impact of the single platform during intensive operations. There are several additional sidings.
 – the highest station in Hampshire, fully restored in the style of a quiet 1940s Southern Railway station.  The line's Signal and Telegraph department, Permanent Way group, and Building department are all located here, in and around the station yard. There are several sidings. This is where the greatest number of trains pass each other on standard running days.
 – the engineering centre of the line and the location of the locomotive maintenance and running sheds. The station has flower beds and topiary, and the largest of the line's four signal boxes, controlling movements through the station, as well as much shunting to and from the locomotive yard.
Alresford – at the southern end of the line is the top visitor station and has the most passenger facilities, including a museum, buffet and two shops. Most of the carriage stock is stored at this station, with Alresford Train Care performing day-to-day maintenance and cleaning of the carriages.

Imported structures

Signalling and safety systems 

Alton signal box – A new signalling installation has been commissioned at Alton. It is a colour-light system, running from the signal box control panel; this contrasts with the mechanical semaphore signals used on the rest of the line. The new system allows a more intensive train service, making use of the loop, and allows shunting within the station, operations which the previous manual flag signalling did not allow. The new installation makes use of track circuits to detect where the train is situated and can change points and signals accordingly. It can run fully automatically, so there is no need for a signalman, unlike the other signal boxes on the line. When there is no signalman, all Signal Post Telephones are diverted to Medstead & Four Marks signal box. It works on a system where a member of the locomotive crew inserts the token into a token switch, to allow the system to take the next steps.
Ropley signal box – Phase One of the Ropley re-signalling project, construction of the new signal box, has been completed. Phase Two was expected to be completed in 2012. Phase Two will include installation of working distant signals, in place of the existing fixed distant signals. The new signals will be motorised semaphore signals as they are too far from the signal box to be operated mechanically without considerable physical effort by the signalman. The scheme will also include installing Advanced Starting and Outer Home signals in both directions.
AWS (Automatic Warning System) – The Watercress Line is currently the only heritage railway with a complete AWS system. It is used on all distant signals on the line and at all signals in the Alton colour light area, until an AWS gap is reached before the Meon Loop due to the large number of signals. Almost all of the locomotives and multiple units are fitted with it, apart from a couple of steam locomotives.
Train Protection & Warning System – TPWS is not used by the Watercress Line, however the Class 205 Hampshire Unit has TPWS fitted.

Future developments 
Before its closure, the railway joined the South West Main Line at Winchester Junction, two miles (3 km) north of Winchester. The cheapest viable proposals to reinstate the tracks to rejoin Winchester, calling for platforms, embankments, earth cuttings and/or tunnels, have proven too expensive to submit to government or large charities.  The track would need to cross the M3 motorway and replace or tunnel underneath houses and gardens built across the right-of-way between the former other junction of the railway (with electrified railways) and Itchen Abbas.

2008 lottery grant 
Upon bidding, in October 2008 the Mid Hants Railway received £550,000 from the Heritage Lottery Fund (HLF) for improvement projects.

A new two-track carriage and wagon workshop has been built at Ropley, capable of holding four carriages under cover. The workshop is intended to meet the particular needs for the restoration of wooden vehicles with woodworking machinery, a retained carpenter and apprentice/trainee carpenters.

Extensions to the locomotive workshop are a small machine shop, stores area and a set of volunteers' refreshment and changing facilities. Viewing platforms for visitors take in the locomotive and carriage workshops and the boiler workshop. Materials and displays for interpretation and overview are provided to educate visitors in the work and trades used to maintain and improve a largely manually-maintained, bespoke set of rolling stock.

A historic signal box assisted by a grant from the Railway Heritage Trust is installed at Medstead. It provides a hands-on signalling experience for visitors together with space for an exhibition of Strowger telephone equipment.

The cost of this round of projects exceeded £1m, assisted by funds within the railway and by additional volunteer labour.

The railway was successful in gaining two previous HLF awards: the Old Goods Shed at Alresford was restored and opened in 2000; the wheel drop shed at Ropley was built in 2005.

Incidents 

There have been some incidents at the Watercress Line over its history. Most incidents are confined to mechanical failure of railway systems. On 26 July 2010, a fire broke out in the newly constructed Carriage and Wagon workshop at Ropley station.

References

Further reading

External links 

Mid Hants Railway – "The Watercress Line" official website.

 
Heritage railways in Hampshire
Alton, Hampshire